Leendert Proos "Leen" Hoogendijk (2 July 1890 - 14 August 1969) was a Dutch male water polo player. He was a member of the Netherlands men's national water polo team. He competed with the team at the 1920 Summer Olympics.

See also
 Netherlands men's Olympic water polo team records and statistics
 List of men's Olympic water polo tournament goalkeepers

References

External links
 

1890 births
1969 deaths
Dutch male water polo players
Water polo goalkeepers
Water polo players at the 1920 Summer Olympics
Olympic water polo players of the Netherlands
Sportspeople from Rotterdam
20th-century Dutch people